The Natal Government Railways Class K 0-4-0ST of 1891 was a South African steam locomotive from the pre-Union era in the Colony of Natal.

In 1891, the Natal Government Railways placed five 	 locomotives in service as shunting engines. One was later sold to the Pretoria-Pietersburg Railway, while two more went to the Harbour Board of Natal. In 1905 or 1906, the remaining two of these locomotives became part of the Natal . By 1912, four of these locomotives survived to come onto the roster of the South African Railways as unclassified obsolete locomotives.

Manufacturer
Five  shunting locomotives were delivered to the Natal Government Railways (NGR) from Neilson and Company in 1891, numbered in the range from 89 to 93.

Characteristics
The locomotive's cylinders were arranged outside the frame, while the slide valves were arranged between the frames and actuated by Stephenson valve gear link motion through rocker shafts. The locomotive was equipped with a No. 40 combination ejector and two vacuum brake cylinders, each  in diameter.

Service

Harbour Board of Natal
In c. 1896, two of the locomotives were either sold or leased to the Harbour Board of Natal for use as harbour shunters at Durban Harbour, where they were named Andy and Dick King.

Pretoria-Pietersburg Railway
In c. 1897, another one of the locomotives, no. 90, was sold to the Pretoria-Pietersburg Railway (PPR), where it was named Natal and employed as a shunting engine. By 1912, when the South African Railways (SAR) classification and renumbering program was executed, this locomotive had also seen service with the Nederlandsche-Zuid-Afrikaansche Spoorweg-Maatschappij (NZASM) and the Imperial Military Railways (IMR) and was still in service on the Central South African Railways (CSAR), who used it as a shop engine in the Pretoria railway workshops.

Natal Government Railways

The other two locomotives remained in service on the NGR, where they were later renumbered to 510 and 511. By the turn of the 20th Century they were used on light duties like the testing of the vacuum brakes of passenger trains at Durban Station, such as the depicted Princess Christian Hospital Train which was used to attend wounded soldiers during the Second Boer War.

Both locomotives were still in service in 1905, but by the end of 1906, no. 510 had disappeared from the books.

South African Railways
When the Union of South Africa was established on 31 May 1910, the three Colonial government railways (Cape Government Railways, NGR and CSAR) were united under a single administration to control and administer the railways, ports and harbours of the Union. Although the South African Railways and Harbours came into existence in 1910, the actual classification and renumbering of all the rolling stock of the three constituent railways was only implemented with effect from 1 January 1912.

In 1912, Andy, Dick King, no. 511 and the Pretoria shop locomotive Natal came onto the roster of the SAR as unclassified obsolete locomotives. The named engines retained their names on the SAR, while no. 511 was renumbered 0511.

Works numbers
The locomotive numbers, works numbers, names and SAR renumber information are listed in the table. The three unspecified names can all be any one of Andy, Dick King or no. 510.

References

0730
0-4-0ST locomotives
B locomotives
Neilson locomotives
Cape gauge railway locomotives
Railway locomotives introduced in 1891
1891 in South Africa
Scrapped locomotives